Monte Castello is a mountain in Liguria, northern Italy, part of the Ligurian Apennines.  It is located in the provinces of Genoa and Alessandria. It lies at an altitude of 1092 metres.

Conservation 
The mountain since 1989 is included in the Parco naturale regionale dell'Antola.

References

Mountains of Liguria
Mountains of Piedmont
One-thousanders of Italy
Mountains of the Apennines